John Allan Martin Åslund (born 10 November 1976) is a Swedish former professional footballer who played as a midfielder. He represented Djurgårdens IF, IFK Norrköping, AIK, Salernitana, Viborg FF, and Assyriska during a career that spanned between 1994 and 2009. He won four caps and scored two goals for the Sweden national team between 1998 and 2001.

Club career
Åslund joined Djurgårdens IF in 1993 and won the 1994 JSM för klubblag with the Djurgården under-18 squad. In 1995, he made his Allsvenskan debut for Djurgården in a 2–2 draw against Västra Frölunda and played for Djurgården until they were relegated in 1996.

International career 
After having appeared for the Sweden U17, U19, and U21 teams, Åslund made his full international debut for the Sweden national team 14 October 1998 in a UEFA Euro 2000 qualifier against Bulgaria. He started the game as a forward alongside Henrik Larsson until the 71st minute when he was replaced by Jesper Blomqvist in a 1–0 win.

Åslund scored his first goal for Sweden in a friendly 4–1 win against Thailand on 10 February 2001 after coming on as a substitute for Rade Prica in the 66th minute. He won a total of four caps during his career, scoring two goals.

Personal life 
He is the son of the former Sweden international Sanny Åslund who was a squad member at the 1978 FIFA World Cup. After his footballing career he has worked as a football pundit for Swedish television.

Career statistics

Honours 
Djurgårdens IF
 Division 1 Norra: 1994
AIK

 Svenska Cupen: 1998–99

References

External links

Martin Åslund at playerhistory.com

Living people
1976 births
Swedish footballers
Association football midfielders
Sweden under-21 international footballers
Sweden youth international footballers
Sweden international footballers
AIK Fotboll players
IFK Norrköping players
Djurgårdens IF Fotboll players
Viborg FF players
U.S. Salernitana 1919 players
Assyriska FF players
Serie B players
Danish Superliga players
Allsvenskan players
Superettan players
Swedish expatriate footballers
Expatriate footballers in Italy
Expatriate men's footballers in Denmark
Swedish expatriate sportspeople in Denmark
Swedish expatriate sportspeople in Italy
Footballers from Stockholm